Love to Love You Donna is the remix album by American singer Donna Summer. It was released on 22 October 2013 by Verve Records. The album was Summer's first posthumous release after her death from lung cancer in May 2012, and achieved some success in the United States, debuting and peaking at number 97 on the Billboard 200.

Track listing

Charts

References

External links
 

Donna Summer albums
Verve Records remix albums
2013 remix albums
Remix albums by American artists
Remix albums published posthumously